Flamborough Lifeboat Station is a Royal National Lifeboat Institution (RNLI) lifeboat station located at Flamborough in the East Riding of Yorkshire, England. There used to be two lifeboat stations at Flamborough; one on the north side of Flamborough Head, and on one the south side. Since 1993, the village has just one lifeboat station on the southern side of Flamborough Head. The station operates an ILB (Inshore Lifeboat).

History
A north station at Flamborough was built in 1871 as No. 1 station, Flamborough. No. 2 site was built in the same year, but closed in 1938. Both sites were opened after the Great Gale of 1871 when many ships were wrecked along the east coast of England. As the coastline at Flamborough Head juts out for  into the North Sea, having two sites on either side of the Head would mean that from wherever the wind was blowing in bad weather, at least one of the lifeboats could be launched. A slipway was added to the No. 1 site in 1890, but ultimately, the two Flamborough sites were amalgamated into one on the northern site in the 1930s. Both sites used skids and poles to aid the launching of the lifeboats into the water, and in 1934, when the No. 1 lifeboathouse was enlarged for the Elizabeth and Albina Whitley, a turntable was also added at the top to aid recovery of the vessel.

In 1992, the south site was demolished and rebuilt to accommodate lifeboats in one location. A rebuild was also necessary as the old No. 2 site was not big enough to accommodate the newer lifeboats and had been in use as a fishing store. The move to the old No. 2 site involved a withdrawal of the All-Weather Lifeboat (ALB) and an Inshore Lifeboat (ILB) being installed in its place. The crew at Flamborough were reluctant to take on an ILB instead of an ALB, which they put down to the tides and waters around Flamborough being particularly tricky. The new site was opened in 1993.

In 2018, the Flamborough lifeboat Elizabeth Jane Palmer featured in an episode of the BBC2 documentary Saving Lives at Sea.

Notable incidents

Carol Sandra and North Wind (1984)

On the morning of 7 May 1984, the fishing coble, Carol Sandra left port at Bridlington to take her lobster and crab pots further out to sea. At some point in the morning, the Carol Sandra sank without any signs, warnings, mayday calls or distress signals sent out. Just before noon, someone noticed the bow of a ship sticking up vertically out of the water and called the coastguard. A search was conducted by an RAF Search and Rescue helicopter, as well as the Flamborough Lifeboat and staff from the coastguard searching from the clifftops. A pleasure boat on a fishing trip, the North Wind III also helped with the search. As the North Wind III approached something that her crew had seen in the water, she was capsized by the rough sea, which catapulted all seven aboard into the water.

En route to the search area, the Flamborough Lifeboat's engine developed problems, so the  Lifeboat was launched so that the Flamborough Lifeboat could return for repairs. Unfortunately the Bridlington Lifeboat struck one of the pieces of wreckage from the Carol Sandra which jammed between her propeller and her hull. This meant deploying the  Lifeboat to the scene whilst the others went back to port. The RAF winchman in the helicopter was transferring one casualty from the water into the lifeboat when he bumped awkwardly into the wheelhouse and broke his pelvis. The casualty went into the water on one side of the boat, and then popped up on the other side where a lifeboatman rescued him. The winchman was taken to hospital, whilst another man managed to be rescued from the water on the winch without the winchman being present. The captain of the North Wind III and one other crew member (his son) found an air pocket underneath the upturned boat and were dragged ashore. Three of the fishermen drowned.

In all seven men drowned with only three of the bodies being found. The ashes of those who died were scattered in the North Sea. There is a memorial to the seven men lost in the village and another in the churchyard of St Oswald's in Flamborough.

Fleet

No. 1 Station (North Landing) 1871-1993

No. 2 Station (South Landing) 1871–1938

Flamborough Lifeboat Station (South Landing) 1993–

References

Sources

External links
Footage from the last Flamborough Lifeboat Day in 1991

Lifeboat stations in Yorkshire
Buildings and structures in the East Riding of Yorkshire
Flamborough